Gordana Siljanovska-Davkova (Macedonian: Гордана Силјановска-Давкова, 11 May 1955 in Ohrid) is a Macedonian university professor and lawyer. She was a candidate for the 2019 presidential elections of North Macedonia. She was defeated by Stevo Pendarovski.

Biography 
Gordana Siljanovska-Davkova was born on May 11, 1955 in Ohrid, Yugoslavia. She completed her primary and secondary education in Skopje. She graduated from the Faculty of Law at the Ss. Cyril and Methodius University in Skopje in 1978, where she also received her master's degree. She earned her PhD degree at the University of Ljubljana.

She was elected Assistant Professor in Political System at the Faculty of Law in Skopje (1989), Associate Professor in Constitutional Law and Political System (1994). She became a full professor in 2004. She was a member of the Constitutional Commission of the Assembly of the Republic of Macedonia (1990-1992) and minister without portfolio in the first Cabinet of Branko Crvenkovski (1992-1994). UN Expert and Vice President of the Independent Local Self-Government Group of the Council of Europe. She has also served as a member of the Venice Commission. She is the author of hundreds of scientific papers on constitutional law and the political system.

In the period 2017-2018, as a public figure, she opposed the adoption of the Albanian language extension law, the Friendship Treaty with Bulgaria and the Prespa Agreement signed with Greece.

In VMRO-DPMNE's conference at Struga, she was nominated as the candidate for the party in the presidential elections of 2019. After her nomination, she promised that if she won, she would initiate a second referendum and restore the old name to the country.

References 

1955 births
Living people
People from Ohrid
Ss. Cyril and Methodius University of Skopje alumni
Academic staff of the Ss. Cyril and Methodius University of Skopje
University of Ljubljana alumni
Macedonian jurists
VMRO-DPMNE politicians
Women government ministers of North Macedonia
Candidates for President of North Macedonia
21st-century Macedonian women politicians
21st-century Macedonian politicians